OnMilwaukee is a digital media company and online magazine that provides lifestyle and culture news about Milwaukee, Wisconsin.  The site features approximately 1015 articles, blogs and briefs each day, focusing on dining, arts and entertainment, movies, music and sports.

The company also has a subsidiary, LiFT Digital Solutions, which serves as a digital-only media agency.

Currently, the company employs approximately 20 people, including writers, programmers, graphic designers and salespeople. OnMilwaukee's editorial staff includes Andy Tarnoff, Bobby Tanzilo, Molly Snyder, Matt Mueller, Carolynn Buser and Lori Fredrich, along with regular commentary from freelance reporters.

History 
OnMilwaukee was formed by three local entrepreneurs (Andy Tarnoff, Jeff Sherman and Jon Krouse) in 1998.

In 2004, the company acquired RummageWorks, LLC, an online classified company. In 2009, it launched The In Click Network, which is an aggregating tool that allows the company to launch new city and topical sites. In 2010, it launched LiFT Digital Solutions.

Awards 
OnMilwaukee is the winner of the 2012, 2015, 2017, 2020 and 2022 EPPY Awards for Best Entertainment Website and Best Entertainment/Cultural News on a Website.

References

External links
Official Website

1998 establishments in Wisconsin
Local interest magazines published in the United States
Online magazines published in the United States
Magazines established in 1998
Magazines published in Wisconsin
Mass media in Milwaukee